Bershad (translit., Bershad’;) is a town in the Vinnytsia Oblast (province) of Ukraine, located in the historic region of Podolia. It is the administrative center of the predominantly-agricultural Bershad Raion (district). Population:

History

Bershad was first mentioned in 1459. It was a private town of Poland, owned by the families of Zbaraski and Moszyński. Polish nobleman Piotr Stanisław Moszyński built a palace complex in Bershad. The only remaining parts of the complex are the park and the chapel of Moszyński and Jurjewicz families.

In 1648, during the Khmelnytsky Uprising under the Cossacks, Maksym Kryvonis conquered Bershad and slew many of the Catholics and Jews there. Before World War II, the city had an important Jewish community. Bershad was famous in the middle of the nineteenth century for its Jewish weavers of the tallit, a ritual shawl worn by Jews at prayer. By the end of the century, the demand decreased, and the industry declined, leading many of the weavers to emigrate to America. In 1900 the Jewish population of Bershad was 4,500, out of a total population of 7,000. The Jewish artisans numbered about 500. The community possessed synagogues and several houses of prayer. One synagogue survived World War II and was not closed during Soviet times. It is still active.

During World War II, the Romanian forces under the direction of the Nazi Germans transformed the Bershad area into a ghetto. The city was part of the Romanian Transnistria Governorate. Many of the ghetto victims were not Jews from Bershad but Jews brought in from Bessarabia. Thousands of Jews were starved to death in the ghetto during the Holocaust including Bessarabian Hebrew writer and Yiddish poet Mordechai Goldenberg.

Many Jews worldwide bear a "Bershidsky/Bershadsky" surname referring to the town.

Bershad is also notable for being the least Romanian town within the Transnistria Governorate. According to the Romanian census conducted throughout the Governorate during late 1941, out of 4,361 town inhabitants, there was only 1 Romanian (a proportion of 0.02%).

Sports
Bershad is home to the football club FC Nyva Bershad.

Notable people
 Yury Kovalenko (1977–2014), a Ukrainian military leader, Hero of Ukraine
 Anatoliy Matviyenko (1953–2020), a Ukrainian politician
 Witold Pruszkowski (1846–1896), a Polish painter, was born in Bershad
 Roman Shvartsman (born 1936), a chairman of the Odessa regional Association of Jews – former prisoners of ghetto and Nazi concentration camps
 Nadezhda Ulanovskaya (1903–1986), a Soviet intelligence GRU officer

References

External links
  Bershad RADA - Bershad Local Council
  Bershad RDA  - Bershad Raion State Administration
  Bershad city and Bershad's district - portal of Bershad
  portal of Bershad city - portal of Bershad city
  Bershad. Electronic Jewish encyclopedia

 
Cities in Vinnytsia Oblast
Cities of district significance in Ukraine
1459 in Ukraine
Olgopolsky Uyezd
Holocaust locations in Ukraine